Desjardins is a borough of the city of Lévis, Quebec.  It was created on January 1, 2002.

It has three districts, corresponding to former municipalities:
 Lévis (the territory of the pre-2002 city)
 Pintendre
 Saint-Joseph-de-la-Pointe-De Lévy

The pre-2002 city of Lévis had already annexed the former municipalities of Lauzon and Saint-David-de-l'Auberivière in 1989.

See also 

 Desjardins (disambiguation)

References

Boroughs of Lévis, Quebec